Simsalabim is the second album by stoner rock quartet The Mushroom River Band. It was released in 2002 and contains ten tracks.

Track listing
"Simsalabim"
"Bugs"
"Make It Happen"
"Change It"
"My Vote Is Blank"
"Tree of No Hope"
"Proud of Being Cool"
"Time-Laps"
"The Big Sick Machine"
"Run Run Run"
"Enemies We Stay" (bonus track for Japan)
"D.D.D" (bonus track on LP version)

References

2002 albums
The Mushroom River Band albums
MeteorCity albums